Janis Crystal Lipzin, (born 1945) is an American artist working with film, photography, video, audio, multi-media installations, and media performance. She has been an active filmmaker since 1974, when she became attracted to using Super-8 cameras, in part because of their easy portability and flexibility to make changes to a film up to the moment of projection. Her more recent work incorporates both digital and analog film methods.   wherein light and photo-chemistry collide and conspire to reveal aspects of our world deserving of more careful scrutiny.  Her work blends an enduring interest in the volatility of nature and human events with a sympathy for alternative, hand-made methods that she interweaves with digital processes. Lipzin is based in Sonoma County, California.

Lipzin attended Ohio University where she received a BFA, New York University where she studied painting, and the San Francisco Art Institute where she received an MFA. After receiving her BFA, she attended the University of Pittsburgh where she received an MSLS in Library and Information Science.

Her work has been recognized with exhibitions at the Museum of Modern Art, New York Film Society, Centre Pompidou (Paris), Venice Biennale, San Francisco Museum of Modern Art, the Tate Modern and other international venues. Lipzin's work was included in the Dreamlands: Immersive Cinema and Art 1905–2016 exhibition and the Color of Light exhibition at the Whitney Museum of American Art.

She taught at the San Francisco Art Institute from 1978 to 2009 where she served as Chair of the Film Department and before that directed the Film/Photography Program at Antioch College in Yellow Springs, Ohio.

Among her awards are fellowships, commissions and grants from the John Simon Guggenheim Memorial Foundation,  National Endowment for the Arts, Center for Cultural Innovation, Ohio Arts Council, California Arts Council, Mission Eye and Ear,  and Echo Park Film Center, Los Angeles.

Lipzin's work is included in the Carnegie Museum of Art's collection Berkeley Art Museum, and the New Museum of Contemporary Art in New York.

References

External links
 Official website
 Reproductions from New Museum catalog for Outside New York: The State of Ohio

1945 births
Living people
Artists from the San Francisco Bay Area
American women artists
Artists from California
American experimental filmmakers
San Francisco Art Institute alumni
Women experimental filmmakers
American women photographers
Fine art photographers
21st-century American women